Charles Fawcett may refer to:

 Charles Fawcett (historian), British historian
 Charles Fawcett (politician) (1813–1890), Australian politician
 Charles Bungay Fawcett (1883–1952), British geographer
 Charles Fernley Fawcett (1915–2008), American adventurer, resistance fighter and actor